Ndroq is a village and a former municipality near Tirana, the capital of Albania. It is part of Tirana County. At the 2015 local government reform it became a subdivision of the municipality Tirana. The population at 2011 census was 5,035.

References 

Former municipalities in Tirana County
Administrative units of Tirana
Villages in Tirana County